Deurick Johnatan da Silva Pinheiro (born July 17, 1981 in Boa Vista), simply known as Deurick, is a Brazilian footballer who plays as defender for Princesa do Solimões. He already played for national competitions such as Copa do Brasil, Copa Verde and Campeonato Brasileiro Série D.

Career statistics

References

External links

1981 births
Living people
Brazilian footballers
Association football defenders
Campeonato Brasileiro Série D players
Esporte Clube São José players
Clube Esportivo Bento Gonçalves players
People from Boa Vista, Roraima
Sportspeople from Roraima